Tim Curran is an American author of horror fiction from the Upper Peninsula of Michigan.

His works include the novels Skin Medicine, Hive, Dead Sea, Resurrection, Skull Moon, The Devil Next Door, and Biohazard. His most recent books have been The Spawning, the short story collections Bone Marrow Stew and Zombie Pulp, and the novellas "1867: The Skulleater Campaign", "The Corpse King", and "Fear Me".

Bibliography

Novels
2004: Skull Moon (Amber Quill Press)
2004: Grim Riders (Amber Quill Press)
2004: Skin Medicine (Hellbound Books, 2004|Severed Press, 2009)
2005: Hive (Elder Signs Press)
2007: Dead Sea (Dimension Books)
2009: The Devil Next Door (Severed Press|Festa Verlag, 2011|Altar 13, 2012)
2009: Resurrection (Severed Press)
2010: Biohazard (Severed Press|Festa Verlag, 2012)
2010: The Spawning (Elder Signs Press)
2011: The Shadow Over Germany with H.P. Lovecraft (Festa Verlag)
2012: Graveworm (Severed Press|Thunderstorm Black Voltage, 2012)
2012: Hive--revised, unabridged  (Severed Press)
2012: Hive 2--revised, unabridged (Severed Press)
2012: Cannibal Corpse, M/C (Permuted Press)
2012: Long Black Coffin (DarkFuse)
2013: Hag Night (Severed Press)
2013: House of Skin (Comet Press)
2018: Nightcrawlers (Crossroad Press)
2019: Clownflesh (Bloodshot Books)

Novellas
2010: The Corpse King (Cemetery Dance Publications|Atlantis Verlag, 2011)
2010: 1867: The Skulleater Campaign (Cemetery Dance Publications)
2011: Fear Me (Delirium Books)
2012: The Underdwelling (Delirium Books)
2012: Puppet Graveyard (Delirium Books)

Selected Short Stories
2000: Red Sea in The Edge #8
2001: The Resurrection Man in Black October Vol. 1 #2
2002: Diary of Need in Space & Time #95
2003: Queen of Spades in Flesh & Blood #11 (2003)
2003: Ghost Herds in The Horror Express #1 (2003)
2004: The Snake Man in Dark Animus #7 (2004)
2004: Graveyard in Inhuman! Magazine #2 (2004)
2005: Please Stand By in Book of Dark Wisdom #7 (Elder Signs Press)
2006: Pumpkin Witch in Shivers IV (Cemetery Dance Publications)
2007: Wormwood in Horrors Beyond 2 (Elder Signs Press)
2007: The Legend of Black Betty in The Undead: Flesh Feast (Permuted Press)
2008: Cemetery Nevada in Frontier Cthulhu (Chaosium Books)
2009: Maggots in Vile Things (Comet Press)
2010: Evil, Bent, and Candy-Sweet in Sick Things (Comet Press)
2010: Monkey House in Zombie Zoology (Severed Press)
2011: Lonely After Dark in Dead Bait 2 (Severed Press)
2012: Scarecrows in the Nebraska Moonlight in Inhuman! Magazine #5
2012: Nemesis Theory in Cthulhu Unbound 3 (Permuted Press)

Collections
2010: Four Rode Out with Brian Keene, Tim Lebbon, and Steve Vernon (Cemetery Dance Publications)
2011: Zombie Pulp (Severed Press, 2011)
2011: Bone Marrow Stew (Tasmaniac Publications)
2019: Dead Sea Chronicles (Bloodshot Books)

References

External links
Official website
Horror News Interview
Horror World Forum: Tim Curran Section
Monster Librarian Interview
Dread Central Interview

American horror writers
Living people
Writers from Michigan
Year of birth missing (living people)
American male novelists